Combined gas turbine and gas turbine (COGAG) is a type of propulsion system for ships using two gas turbines connected to a single propeller shaft. A gearbox and clutches allow either of the turbines to drive the shaft or both of them combined.

Using one or two gas turbines has the advantage of having two different power settings. Since the fuel efficiency of a gas turbine is best near its maximum power level, a small gas turbine running at its full power is more efficient compared to a twice as powerful turbine running at half power, allowing more-economical transit at cruise speeds.

Compared to combined diesel and gas (CODAG) or combined diesel or gas (CODOG), COGAG systems have a smaller footprint but a much lower fuel efficiency at cruise speed and for CODAG systems it is also somewhat lower for high speed dashes.

List of COGAG ships 
 guided-missile destroyer (Indian Navy)
 (aircraft-carrier) (Indian Navy)
Type 22 frigate (Batch 3)  (Royal Navy)
 (Royal Navy)
 (Italian Navy)
 (Japan Maritime Self-Defense Force), and subsequent destroyer classes
 (Japan Maritime Self-Defense Force), helicopter carrier
 (Japan Maritime Self-Defense Force), helicopter carrier
Type 055 destroyer (People's Liberation Army Navy)
 (Russian Navy)
 (Republic of Korea Navy)
 (Royal Norwegian Navy)
 (United States Navy)
 (United States Navy)
 (United States Navy)

Marine propulsion